PTT Exploration and Production Public Company Limited, also known as PTTEP, is a national petroleum  exploration and production company based in Thailand. It is a subsidiary of the state-owned PTT Public Company Limited. The company was founded on 20 June 1985.

PTTEP's core business is exploration and production of petroleum in Thailand and foreign countries. As of June 30, 2018, PTTEP Group had 40 petroleum exploration and production projects in 11 countries; 16 projects in Thailand, 15 projects in Southeast Asia, 5 projects in Americas, 3 projects in Africa and 1 project in Australia.

Products and Services

 Petroleum including petroleum, crude, natural gas, condensate, liquified petroleum gas (LPG).
 Gas Transportation Pipeline
 Jetty and Warehouse: Petroleum Development Support Songkla Branch and Ranong Branch
 PTT Digital Solutions Company (PTT ICT)
 Energy Complex Company Limited
 PTTEP Services Limited
 PTT Global LNG Limited (PTT GL)

References

External links
Company website

Oil and gas companies of Thailand
PTT group
Companies listed on the Stock Exchange of Thailand